Ruut Veenhoven  (born 1942) is a Dutch sociologist and a pioneer and world authority on the scientific study of happiness, in the sense of subjective enjoyment of life. His work on the social conditions for human happiness at Erasmus University Rotterdam in the Netherlands, has contributed to a renewed interest in happiness as an aim for public policy. He has shown that happiness can be used a reliable measure to assess progress in societies which was one of the sources of inspiration for the United Nations to adopt happiness measures as a holistic approach to development. 
Veenhoven is the founding director of the World Database of Happiness and a founding editor of the Journal of Happiness Studies.  He has been described as "the godfather of happiness studies", and "a leading authority on worldwide levels of happiness from country to country", whose work "earned him international acclaim".

Biography 

Veenhoven was born in The Hague in the Netherlands in 1942. He graduated in 1962 from the Nederlands Lyceum in The Hague and received a master's degree in sociology (specializing in public management) from Erasmus University in Rotterdam (1969). Subsequently, he completed a PhD in the Social Sciences also at Erasmus, with a dissertation on "The Condition of Happiness". He was also registered as a social-sexologist (1994–2000). 
Between 1970 and 1990 Veenhoven was a leading advocate of abortion law reform and in promoting acceptance of voluntary childlessness in The Netherlands.
 
From 2001 until his retirement in 2007 he taught in Rotterdam as professor of 'Social conditions for human happiness', where he currently works in the Erasmus Happiness Economics Research Organization (Ehero). Since 1985 he has been director of the World Database of Happiness at Erasmus University Rotterdam. 
From 1995 until 2002 he was extraordinary professor of Humanism at the University of Utrecht in the Netherlands (Piet Thoenes chair).

In 1984 Veenhoven earned his doctorate on the dissertation ‘Conditions of Happiness’ that synthesized the results of 245 empirical studies on happiness. On that basis he developed the World Database of Happiness, which now covers 20,000 research findings taken from 3500 empirical investigations. Veenhoven is mentioned in the top 5% of authors in his field (December 2012).

Awards 
The International Society for Quality of Life Studies (ISQOLS) has awarded Veenhoven several times:
 1997: Research Fellow Award
 2000: Best Annual SIR Paper Award
 2001: Distinguished QOL Researcher Award
 2009: Best Annual JOHS Paper Award.
 2012: Distinguished service award

Research on happiness 

His main research subject is happiness in the sense of subjective enjoyment of life. Worldwide he is seen as a pioneer in that field.

 Main findings are:
 Happiness is universal. All humans tend to assess how much they like the life they live and conditions for happiness are quite similar. Yet there is some cultural variation in beliefs about happiness. Happiness draws on gratification of universal needs, rather than on meeting culturally relative wants.
 Need gratification depends both on the livability of society and the life-ability of individuals.
 Greater happiness of a greater number is possible in contemporary societies and can be ‘engineered’, among other things in the following ways:
 Fostering freedom, so that people can choose the way of life that fits them best.
 Informing people about effects of major choices on the happiness of people like them. This requires large scale long-term follow-up studies comparable to research in nutrition.
 Investing in mental health, professionalization of life-coaching.
 Happiness signals that we are functioning well and for that reason happiness goes hand-in-hand with good health, both mental and physical. Happy people live longer.
 Being happy combines well with doing good. Happier people do better in relationships, do more voluntary work and are more interested in other people and their problems.

References

External links 
 Personal page at Erasmus University 
 Publications

Dutch sociologists
Academic staff of Erasmus University Rotterdam
Living people
Politicians from The Hague
1942 births